Hesperumia sulphuraria, known generally as the sulphur moth or sulphur wave, is a species of geometrid moth in the family Geometridae. It is found in North America.

The MONA or Hodges number for Hesperumia sulphuraria is 6431.

References

Further reading

External links

 

Boarmiini
Articles created by Qbugbot
Moths described in 1873